Clarence "Butch" Dick  (Yux'way'lupton) (born 1946) is a Lekwungen artist, educator and activist residing in Victoria, British Columbia, Canada.

Education 
Dick attended residential school in Penelakut Island, Indian day school, and public and private schools in Victoria.  He studied design at the Vancouver School of Art in the 1960s, as well as at Camosun College.

Career 
Dick began his career in education first at Shoreline Middle school (District 61), teaching First Nations arts & culture in the early 1980s. He was an assistant professor at University of Victoria, where he taught an Indigenous Learning course. He is also regarded as a Master Carver of Coast Salish totem poles. Dick is now an elder of the Songhees First Nation community.

Public art 
In 2014, Dick was the designer of the Rock Bay Mural Project on Government and Princess streets in Victoria, BC, in collaboration with Darlene Gait. The project was a collaboration between the Songhees and Esquimalt First Nations, BC Hydro and Tervita Corporation.

"Two Brothers" Spirit Poles in Spirit Square, Victoria, BC are a collaboration between Butch Dick and his son, Clarence Jr. The painted wood poles were erected in 2009 and are 18 feet high. The pair comprises a traditionally designed pole by Dick and a contemporary design by Clarence Jr.

"Signs of Lekwungen" is a collaboration between Butch Dick, and his sons, Clarence and Bradley. The work is located on 680 Montreal Street in Victoria, B.C. in Laurel Point Park. The sculpture depicts a Coast Salish spindle whorl, in a bronze-cast carving originally done with close-grain Red Cedar. The bronze-casting is anchored to a brown powder coated aluminum pole. The sculpture is 2.5 metres in height and weighs 1000 lbs.

Collections
His work is included in the collections of the British Museum and the Art Gallery of Greater Victoria.

Awards 
Dick was awarded the lifetime achievement award by Leadership Victoria in 2015. He was the first aboriginal elder to receive this award.

References 

Canadian muralists

1946 births
Living people
First Nations artists
Members of the Royal Canadian Academy of Arts